Ivan Raychev  (born 28 February 1977) is a Bulgarian footballer who currently plays for Kaliakra Kavarna as a defender.

References

External links 
 
  Kaliakra Kavarna profile

1977 births
Living people
Bulgarian footballers
First Professional Football League (Bulgaria) players
PFC Cherno More Varna players
PFC Litex Lovech players
PFC Vidima-Rakovski Sevlievo players
PFC Kaliakra Kavarna players
People from Kavarna
Association football defenders